Commandant Bourdais (F 740) was a Commandant Rivière-class frigate of French Navy. She was later transferred to National Navy of Uruguay in 1991.

Development and design 

The main gun armament of the Commandant Rivière class consisted of three of the new French  guns, with a single turret located forward and two turrets aft. These water-cooled automatic dual-purpose guns could fire a  shell at an effective range of  against surface targets and  against aircraft at a rate of 60 rounds per minute. Two triple torpedo tubes were fitted for anti-submarine torpedoes, while the ship's armament was completed by two  Hotchkiss HS-30 cannon. The ships had accommodation for an 80-man commando detachment with two fast landing boats, each capable of landing 25 personnel.

Construction and career 
Commandant Bourdais was laid down in April 1959 and launched on 15 April 1961 at Arsenal de Lorient in Lorient. The frigate was commissioned on 10 March 1963.

The ship was sold to Uruguay in 1991 and given the new name Uruguay and was in service until 2008. She was sold for scrap some years later.

References

1961 ships
Commandant Rivière-class frigates